USS Wakiva II (SP-160), often referred to as USS Wakiva, was an armed yacht that served in the United States Navy from 1917 to 1918 and saw combat in World War I. She was originally the yacht SS Wakiva II built for Lamon V. Harkness in Scotland.

Wakiva II served as a convoy escort out of Brest, France, and had several encounters with German submarines. The ship received credit for a "probably seriously damaged" submarine in November 1917. Two men aboard Wakiva II were lost in the collision and sinking.

Navy career 
Wakiva II was a steel-hulled steam yacht built in the United Kingdom at Leith, Scotland, by Ramage and Ferguson for Lamon V. Harkness. She was launched on 3 February 1907, and served first Lamon Harkness and then his son Harry in the days before World War I. While owned by the Harkness family, Wakiva II ranged from the North Sea to the Netherlands East Indies.

After the United States entered World War I, the United States Navy acquired Wakiva II on 20 July 1917 and commissioned her as USS Wakiva II on 6 August 1917 at the Boston Navy Yard in Boston, Massachusetts. While shipwrights were still laboring to complete the conversion of the erstwhile pleasure craft to a man-of-war for "distant service," Captain Thomas P. Magruder made Wakiva II his flagship as Commander, Squadron Four, Patrol Force, on 18 August 1917.

Necessary alterations complete, Wakiva II departed Boston on 25 August 1917 bound for Provincetown, Massachusetts, in company with six French submarine chasers and the remainder of the squadron — a collection of converted fishing vessels and patrol boats. The ships departed Provincetown 26 August 1917 for France.

Wakiva II paused at Ponta Delgada in the Azores from 6 September 1917 to 11 September 1917, towing  part of the distance from the United States, due to a breakdown in P. K. Baumans propulsion system, and arrived at Brest, France, on 18 September 1917. On 27 September 1917, Captain Magruder hauled down his pennant to establish headquarters ashore.

Wakiva II operated on patrol and escort duty out of Brest from the autumn of 1917.

On 28 October 1917, when transport  was torpedoed, Wakiva II and armed yacht  teamed to pick up survivors, standing towards the damaged ship soon after she was hit. Wakiva II lowered two boats and manned one of the transport's lifeboats, eventually rescuing 126 men before setting course for Brest.

On 23 November 1917, the yacht's lookouts sighted an object  distant which looked initially like a submarine's conning tower. Going to general quarters, the yacht sped towards the contact and commenced fire with her forward guns. After the warship had loosed seven shots, a closer investigation disclosed that the object of their attack — which resulted in the destruction of the object — was a convincingly painted target.

Wakiva II had her first actual head-to-head encounter with the enemy within a week. She sailed from Saint-Nazaire, France, on 28 November 1917 to join up with a westbound convoy. The passage proceeded uneventfully until oiler  fired off two Very pistol stars and sounded a loud blast on her siren. Thus alerted, Wakiva II sounded general quarters and rang down for full speed ahead. While armed yacht  also closed to screen the vulnerable and valuable Kanawha on the starboard side, Wakiva II took up station on the port beam. Thirty minutes of painstaking search revealed nothing to the hunters, however, and the three ships returned to the van of the convoy.

No sooner had the search been discontinued when Noma suddenly sounded another alarm and dropped a depth charge on what her lookouts felt was a submarine. Putting over hard-a-port, Wakiva II commenced fire with her after guns. Her third salvo was thought to have sheared the periscope. As the yacht passed over the suspected submarine the second time, she dropped a depth charge barrage, all of which exploded and sent fuel oil and debris to the surface, indicating that they had heavily hit the enemy submersible. Two hits on the wreckage, fired from number one gun, added the coup de grace to what appeared to be a shattered submarine. Wakiva II made a third pass and sighted three men clinging to wreckage, but by the time the yacht had come full circle, all that remained was the heavy smell of fuel oil and bits and pieces of wreckage on the surface of the sea.

The commanding officer of Wakiva II glowingly praised his crew's performance in the subsequent after-action report, noting their work as a "perfect fighting unit." He wrote that his men showed "admirable coolness and courage," and did not manifest any nervousness or inefficiency. Wakiva II, while receiving credit for only a "probably seriously damaged" submarine, by the British Admiralty, nonetheless was commended by Vice Admiral Henry B. Wilson, commanding naval forces on the coast of France, and Admiral William S. Sims, commanding United States Naval Forces in European waters.

Signalling the report of the sighting to the three ships in the small convoy, U.S. Navy cargo ship , and merchant ships , and —Wakiva II commenced fire with number two and four  guns, checking fire momentarily to avoid hitting Florence H., which was steaming just beyond where the enemy submarine had suddenly appeared. The U-boat quickly submerged, and the yacht remained at the scene for 90 minutes before abandoning the search.

Wakiva II maintained a schedule of patrol and escort out of Brest through the late winter.

Sinking 
On 21 May 1918, Wakiva II steamed in convoy with a group of eight ships on the port flank, heading eastward from the French coast. As fog set in shortly after sunset, speed was reduced. The ships crept along with Wakiva II taking station on the freighter . Zigzagging ceased with the onset of the murky weather, and Noma sent a message to the convoy commodore, in the U.S. Army transport , to this effect. By 03:00 hours on 22 May, visibility improved — but only briefly — before the convoy slipped into another fog bank. The sounds of whistles from the loosely assembled shipping could be heard aboard Wakiva II and, at 03:10 hours, those on watch in Wakiva II distinctly heard Wabashs whistle but could not see the ship. As another blast from the cargo vessel sounded even closer soon thereafter, Lieutenant Commander E. G. Allen, commanding the yacht, ordered the helm put over to port one point (11.25 degrees), and the whistle sounded. Ten seconds later, Wabash loosed another blast, even closer. Suddenly, the shape of the cargo vessel loomed out of the mist and bore down on Wakiva II. Ringing down full speed ahead, Allen ordered a turn to port, but before the helm could be put over, Wabashs bow tore into the yacht's starboard quarter, just abaft the mainmast and forward of the after guns, and ripped a mortal gash in the Wakiva IIs side from the main deck down to the propeller shaft. On board Wakiva II, there had been barely enough time to reach the general alarm. The collision threw both ships briefly on parallel courses, carrying away Wabashs starboard boats. Both ships also hung together briefly before parting, with the cargo vessel slowly going astern.

While two men were lost on board Wakiva II, individual acts of heroism occurred simultaneously. Upon feeling the shock of the collision and hearing the general alarm, Chief Gunner's Mate Oliver P. Cooper, USNRF, ran aft to the fantail where the depth charges were secured, withdrew the bursting pins from the British naval mines stored there, and set the American depth charges on "safe;" he reported that all was "secure" within five minutes of the collision. Electrician Second Class Charles E. Kirkpatrick, USNRF, on watch in the ship's radio room, remained at his post and sent out the SOS, remaining on board until abandoning at the last possible moment. Chief Boatswain's Mate Thomas Olson, USNRF, rigged out the motor whaleboat and rousted out men from below decks, and then, along with the captain, inspected and cleared the ship. Below, as the engine room filled with water, Machinist Mate First Class Charles A. A. Smith began to start the pumps before realizing that at the rate at which the water was cascading in through the rent in the ship's side, the pumps could not hold their own.

As Wakiva II sank by the stern, the captain and his crew pulled clear in the ship's boats at 03:30 hours. Wakiva II disappeared beneath the waves at 03:36 hours, as Wabash simultaneously lowered her undamaged boats and assisted in picking up survivors from the yacht.

References

External links

Department of the Navy: Naval Historical Center Online Library of Selected Images: U.S. Navy ships: USS Wakiva (SP-160), 1917-1918. Originally the civilian yacht Wakiva (II) (1907)

Ships built in Leith
World War I patrol vessels of the United States
Patrol vessels of the United States
1907 ships
Steam yachts